Ukraine competed at the 2009 Winter Universiade in Harbin, China. Ukrainian athletes competed in 10 sports out of 12 except for curling and ice hockey. Ukraine won seven medals, one of which was gold, and ranked 13th.

Medallists

Figure skating

See also
 Ukraine at the 2009 Summer Universiade

References

Sources
 Archive of the official web site
 Results in speed skating
 Results in short track speed skating

Nations at the 2009 Winter Universiade
Ukraine at the Winter Universiade
Winter Universiade